The 1940 Fordham Rams football team represented Fordham University during the 1940 college football season. The Rams finished the regular season ranked twelfth and played in the Cotton Bowl in Dallas on New Year's Day, a 13–12 loss to sixth-ranked Texas A&M.

Schedule

References

Fordham
Fordham Rams football seasons
Fordham Rams football